Samastipur railway division is one of the five railway divisions under East Central Railway zone of Indian Railways. This railway division was formed in 1969 and its headquarter is located at Samastipur in the state of Bihar of India.

Danapur railway division, Mughalsarai railway division, Dhanbad railway division, and Sonpur railway division are the other railway divisions under ECR Zone headquartered at Hajipur.

List of railway stations and towns 
The list includes the stations under the Samastipur railway division and their station category.

References

 
Divisions of Indian Railways
1969 establishments in Bihar